The Middleboro Gazette is a weekly newspaper founded in 1852.  Based in Middleborough, Massachusetts, its coverage area includes Lakeville, Middleboro, and occasionally Freetown as a result of Freetown and Lakeville sharing a regional school system.

The newspaper is produced weekly every Wednesday at the Standard-Times building in New Bedford, Mass and circulates on Thursdays.

Publications established in 1852
Newspapers published in Massachusetts
1852 establishments in Massachusetts